The South African cricket team toured India in June 2022 to play five Twenty20 International (T20I) matches. In September 2021, the Board of Control for Cricket in India (BCCI) confirmed the schedule for the tour. In March 2022, the tour itinerary was updated, with matches moved from Bangalore and Nagpur to Cuttack and Visakhapatnam. In April 2022, the BCCI issued a further update to the tour, with Delhi and Bangalore hosting the first and fifth T20I matches respectively. After the COVID-19 pandemic, this was the first series in India to be played without restrictions.

Ahead of the first T20I match, India's captain KL Rahul was ruled out the series due to a right groin injury. Rishabh Pant was named as India's captain for the matches, with Hardik Pandya named as the team's vice-captain.

South Africa won the opening T20I match by seven wickets, denying India a chance to break the record of most consecutive team wins in the format. South Africa won the second T20I by four wickets to take a 2–0 lead in the series. India then won the third T20I by 48 runs, to give Rishabh Pant his first win as the captain of the Indian team. India won the fourth T20I by 82 runs to level the series with one match to play. However, the fifth and final T20I match was washed out after just 3.3 overs of play, with the series drawn 2–2.

Squads

KL Rahul and Kuldeep Yadav were ruled out of India's squad due to a groin and hand injury respectively. Ahead of the first T20I, South Africa's Aiden Markram tested positive for COVID-19, and was later ruled out of the entire series.

T20I series

1st T20I

2nd T20I

3rd T20I

4th T20I

5th T20I

Notes

References

External links
 Series home at ESPN Cricinfo

2022 in Indian cricket
2022 in South African cricket
International cricket competitions in 2022
South African cricket tours of India